Ivan Tsissaruk (born ) is a Kazakhstani road track cyclist. He competed in the team pursuit event at the 2012 and 2013 UCI Track Cycling World Championships.

Major results
2012
 1st  Overall Tour of East Java

References

External links
 Profile at cyclingarchives.com

1992 births
Living people
Kazakhstani track cyclists
Kazakhstani male cyclists
Place of birth missing (living people)
20th-century Kazakhstani people
21st-century Kazakhstani people